Bloodhound LSR, formerly Bloodhound SSC, is a British land vehicle designed to travel at supersonic speeds with the intention of setting a new world land speed record. The arrow-shaped car, under development since 2008, is powered by a jet engine and will be fitted with an additional rocket engine.

Driver Andy Green will attempt to break his own record, set in 1997. The previous business behind Project Bloodhound went into administration (bankruptcy) in late 2018. Entrepreneur Ian Warhurst bought the car to keep the project alive. A new company called Grafton LSR Ltd was formed to manage the project, which was renamed Bloodhound LSR and moved to SGS Berkeley Green University Technical College. Lack of funds and the COVID-19 pandemic stalled progress in 2020, and in 2021 the vehicle was offered for sale.

The venue for high speed testing and future world land speed record attempts is the Hakskeen Pan in the Mier area of the Northern Cape, South Africa.

Timeline

Inception 
The Bloodhound project was announced on 23 October 2008 at the London Science Museum by Lord Drayson – then Minister of Science in the UK's Department for Innovation, Universities and Skills – who first suggested the project in 2006 to land speed record holders Richard Noble and Andy Green, a pilot and Wing Commander serving in the RAF. The two men, between them, have held the land speed record since 1983.

In 1983, Noble, a self-described engineer and adventurer reached 633 mph (1,019 km/h) driving a turbojet-powered car named Thrust2 across the Nevada desert. Green is also Bloodhound LSR's driver.

The Bloodhound project was named for the Bristol Bloodhound surface-to-air missile, a project that Bloodhound Chief Aerodynamicist Ron Ayers had previously worked on.

The project was at first based in the former Maritime Heritage Centre on the Bristol harbourside, next to Brunel's . In 2013 the project relocated to a larger site in Avonmouth. The head offices of the project moved to Didcot, Oxfordshire in late 2015.

2017 tests 
Runway testing of up to  took place on 26, 28 and 30 October 2017 at Newquay Airport, Cornwall.

2018 change of ownership
However, the company backing the project, Bloodhound Programme Ltd, went into administration (bankruptcy) in late 2018 leaving a funding gap of £25 million, which put the venture's future into question.

The project was "axed" in December 2018, with plans to sell off the remaining assets. Later that month, Yorkshire entrepreneur Ian Warhurst stepped in to rescue the project by buying the assets and intellectual property, including the car, for an undisclosed sum.

2019 tests

In March 2019, it was announced that Warhurst had formed a new company called Grafton LSR Ltd. to manage the project, which became the car's legal owner. The company said in a statement that Warhurst was trying to save the project with new sponsors and partners.

The name of the new team became 'Bloodhound LSR' (for Land Speed Record). The car and the project's headquarters moved to SGS Berkeley Green University Technical College in Berkeley, Gloucestershire near Gloucester.

High speed testing of the car took place at the Hakskeen Pan in October and November 2019. Test runs driven by Green began on 25 October, using only a Rolls-Royce Eurojet EJ200 engine, with an expectation of reaching .

2020–2022 
Lack of funds prevented the fitting of the Nammo rocket in 2020, and combined with the effects of the COVID-19 pandemic, this meant the opportunity to run the vehicle in 2021 was lost. In January 2021, Warhurst said the vehicle was up for sale and it was reported that the team had moved on to other projects. Warhurst stepped aside as CEO in August 2021 and Stuart Edmondson, the project's Engineering Operations Manager for the previous five years, took over the role. When interviewed in July 2022 Edmundson stated that, while on hold, the Bloodhound LSR project was "very much alive" and a new land speed record could be achieved very quickly if new investment could be secured. Edmundson also reported that the project had adopted a new environmental focus, with the aim of achieving a net zero carbon land speed record.

The vehicle currently resides at Coventry Transport Museum.

Design

Car 
The car was designed by Bloodhound's Chief Aerodynamicist Ron Ayers and Chief Engineer Mark Chapman, along with aerodynamicists from Swansea University.

The force on the driver during acceleration would be 2.5 g (two-and-a-half times his body weight) and up to 3 g during deceleration.

Aerodynamics
The aerodynamics of Bloodhound have been carefully calculated to make sure the car is safe and stable, particularly because it will create a shockwave when it reaches the speed of sound.

The College of Engineering at Swansea University has been heavily involved in the aerodynamic shape of the vehicle from the start. Dr Ben Evans and his team used Computational Fluid Dynamics (CFD) technology designed by Professor Oubay Hassan and Professor Ken Morgan to provide an understanding of the aerodynamic characteristics of the proposed shape, at all speeds, including predicting the likely vertical, lateral and drag forces on the vehicle and its pitch and yaw stability. This technology, originally developed for the aerospace industry, was validated for a land-going vehicle during the design of ThrustSSC.

Propulsion
Three prototype Eurojet EJ200 jet engines developed for the Eurofighter and bound for a museum were loaned to the project. A custom monopropellant rocket designed by Nammo will be used to add extra thrust for the world land speed record runs. For the  runs, the monopropellant rocket will be replaced with a hybrid rocket from Nammo. A third engine, a Jaguar supercharged V-8 is used as an auxiliary power unit to drive the oxidiser pump for the rocket, although this will be replaced by an electric motor.

Initially Bloodhound SSC was going to use a custom hybrid rocket motor being designed by Daniel Jubb. The rocket was successfully tested at Newquay Airport in 2012. However, constraints on cost, time and test facilities led to a decision to instead use a rocket designed by Norwegian company Nammo.

At first the plan was that the car would use a Nammo hybrid rocket or cluster of rockets, to be fuelled by solid hydroxyl-terminated polybutadiene and liquid high-test peroxide oxidiser. This plan was revised in 2017 and the car will use a monopropellant rocket for the land speed record runs.

For the car to achieve , the monopropellant rocket would need to produce around 40 kN (8992 lbf) of thrust and the EJ200 jet engine 90 kN (20,232 lbf) in reheat.

Wheels
For low-speed testing at Cornwall Airport Newquay in 2017, the car was fitted with four runway wheels based on those of an English Electric Lightning fighter jet with refurbished original tyres. These were replaced for the high-speed test runs in the desert in South Africa in 2019 by four  diameter wheels weighing , forged from an aircraft-grade aluminium zinc alloy.

Wheel bearings 
Three Timken high-speed (DN around 1,000,000 at full speed) tapered roller bearings support each wheel.

Construction
The car was built at sites in Bristol and Avonmouth. A full-scale model was unveiled at the 2010 Farnborough International Airshow, when it was announced that Hampson Industries would begin to build the rear chassis section of the car in the first quarter of 2011 and that a deal for the manufacture of the front of the car was due. The car was largely completed by October 2017 when full reheat static testing was undertaken with the jet engine at Cornwall Airport Newquay followed by low speed test runs.

Further construction was carried out before the project went into administration and the car was then completed at Berkeley before high speed testing.

Testing locations 
Early in the project, Swansea University's School of the Environment and Society was enlisted to help determine a new test site for the record runs because the test site for the ThrustSSC record attempt had become unsuitable. The local community cleared 16,500 tonnes of stones by hand from an area measuring 22 million square metres to create space for 20 tracks each 10 metres wide, as the car cannot run twice on the same strip of desert.

Low speed runway testing of over  occurred on 26, 28 and 30 October 2017 at Cornwall Airport Newquay.

High speed testing at Hakskeen Pan began in October 2019. The car achieved  on its final run on 16 November 2019.

Education and STEM outreach
The Bloodhound Project had an education component designed to inspire future generations to take up careers in science, technology, engineering and mathematics (STEM) by showcasing these subjects and interacting with young people and students, in partnership with engineering companies including Rolls-Royce. Bloodhound-related education activities are provided by Bloodhound Education Ltd, a standalone charity registered in 2016. The charity's Bloodhound Education Centre is at SGS Berkeley Green UTC.

See also

 Aussie Invader 5R
 List of vehicle speed records
 North American Eagle Project

References

External links

 
 Andy Green's Bloodhound SSC diary for the BBC
 Bloodhound SSC at Swansea University
 Bloodhound SSC at the AoC (Association of Colleges) 2010 Annual Conference
 
 
 

Jet land speed record cars
Rocket land speed record cars